Kasper Antonsen (born 13 April 1994) is a Danish badminton player. Together with his brother Anders Antonsen, he started his career in badminton in Viby, learned from his father who worked at one of the badminton clubs in Aarhus called AB. Antonsen who trained at the Aarhus AB, made his professional debut in 2012, and later, he won the gold medals at the 2013 European Junior Championships in the boys' doubles and mixed team events, also a bronze medal in the mixed doubles event.

Achievements

European Junior Championships 
Boys' doubles

Mixed doubles

BWF International Challenge/Series (8 titles, 3 runners-up) 
Men's doubles

Mixed doubles

  BWF International Challenge tournament
  BWF International Series tournament
  BWF Future Series tournament

References

External links 
 

1994 births
Living people
Sportspeople from Aarhus
Danish male badminton players